Winfield may refer to:

Places

Canada
 Winfield, Alberta
 Winfield, British Columbia

United States
 Winfield, Alabama
 Winfield, Arkansas
 Winfield, Georgia
 Winfield, Illinois
 Winfield, Indiana
 Winfield, Iowa
 Winfield, Kansas
 Winfield, Maryland (southern Carroll County)
 Winfield, Missouri
 Winfield (town), New York
 Winfield, Pennsylvania
 Winfield, Tennessee
 Winfield, Texas
 Winfield, West Virginia
 Winfield, Wisconsin
 Winfield Township, Michigan
 Winfield Township, Renville County, Minnesota
 Winfield Township, New Jersey
 Winfield Township, Butler County, Pennsylvania
 West Winfield, New York

People

Given name

Military
 Winfield Scott Edgerly (1846–1927), United States Army General
 Winfield Scott Hancock (1824–1886), United States Army General
 Winfield Scott Schley (1839-1911),  United States Navy Admiral
 Winfield Scott (1786–1866), United States Army general
 Winfield Scott (chaplain) (1837–1910), United States Army chaplain
 Winfield W. Scott Jr. (born 1927), United States Air Force General
 Winfield W. Scott III, United States Air Force General

Politics
 Winfield Dunn, (born 1927) governor of Tennessee
 Winfield T. Durbin (1847–1928), governor of Indiana
 Winfield Ervin Jr. (1902–1985), mayor of Anchorage
 Winfield Scott Hammond (1863–1915), governor of Minnesota
 Winfield Moses (born 1943), mayor of Fort Wayne
 Winfield M. Kelly, Jr. (born 1935), Maryland politician

Other
 Winfield Scott Chaplin (1847–1918), American academic administrator
 Winfield Scott Hastings (1847–1907), American baseball player
 Winfield Scott (songwriter) (1920–2015), American musician
 Winfield Townley Scott (1910–1968), American writer
 Winfield Scott Stratton (1848–1902), American capitalist

Surname
 Adam C. Winfield, American soldier accused of war crimes
 Antoine Winfield Sr. (born 1977), American football player
 Antoine Winfield Jr. (born 1997), American football player, son of Antoine Winfield Sr.
 A. R. Winfield (d. 1887), American Methodist preacher
 Bert Winfield, (1878-1919) Welsh international rugby union player
 Charles Winfield, 1830s New York politician
 Charles H. Winfield (1822–1888), US congressman from New York
 Dave Winfield (born 1951), Hall of Fame Baseball player
 Gene Winfield (born 1927), American automobile customizer
 John Winfield (born 1944), English footballer
 Lauren Winfield (born 1990), English cricketer
 Paul Winfield (1939-2004), American actor
 Percy Henry Winfield, professor of law
 Thomas Winfield (born 1963), American politician

Commerce
 Winfield (cigarette), an Australian brand of cigarette produced by British American Tobacco
 Winfield Carburetor Company, Los Angeles based maker of carburetors, owned by Ed Winfield
 Own-brand goods sold by the British retailer, Woolworths Group

See also
 
 Winnfield, Louisiana
 Wynnefield, Philadelphia
 Winfield Joad, fictional character in novel and film, The Grapes of Wrath